Live from Albertane is a live album by American pop rock group Hanson. As the name suggests, it is a live album, recorded during the group's Albertane Tour. Albertane is a fictional place (the capital city of the planet Mars) referred to in their song "Man from Milwaukee".

With the lead vocalist Taylor Hanson at age 15 at the time this album was recorded, his voice is noticeably deeper than in their previous releases. The song selection mostly focuses on the Middle of Nowhere album, but also contains some older material, a new track ("Ever Lonely") and a couple of covers of classic songs.

It peaked at #32 on Billboard 200 in 1998.

Track listing
 "Gimme Some Lovin'"/"Shake a Tail Feather" (Davis, Winwood, Winwood, Hayes, Williams, Rice) – 5:07
 "Where's the Love" (Hanson, Hanson, Hanson, Hudson, Salover) – 4:53
 "River" (Hanson, Hanson, Hanson) – 3:28
 "I Will Come to You" (Hanson, Hanson, Hanson, Mann, Weil) – 4:18
 "Ever Lonely" (Hanson, Hanson, Hanson) – 3:07
 "Speechless" (Hanson, Hanson, Hanson, Lironi) – 3:31
 "With You in Your Dreams" (Hanson, Hanson, Hanson) – 4:18
 "A Minute Without You" (Hanson, Hanson, Hanson, Hudson) – 3:34
 "Money (That's What I Want)" (Bradford, Gordy) – 2:17
 "More Than Anything" (Hanson, Hanson, Hanson) – 4:20
 "MMMBop" (Hanson, Hanson, Hanson) – 4:11
 "Man from Milwaukee" (Hanson, Hanson, Hanson) – 4:00

Personnel
 C. Taylor Crothers – photography
 Hanson – producer
 Isaac Hanson – guitar, piano, vocals
 Taylor Hanson – keyboards, vocals
 Zac Hanson – drums, percussion, vocals
 Ted Jensen – digital editing
 Rob Mounsey –	post-production editor
 Elliot Scheiner –	producer, engineer, mixing
 Steve Smith –	assistant engineer
 Shari Sutcliffe – production co-ordination
 Jason Taylor – guitar
 Scott Hogan – bass guitar
 Matt Rhode – piano, organ

References

Hanson (band) albums
1998 live albums
Mercury Records live albums